Tempest Tours, Inc. is a U.S. based travel company. Headquartered in Arlington, Texas, the company takes its guests storm chasing across the Great Plains of the United States and into Canada. Tempest Tours emphasizes learning and safety on their expeditions, and are noted for their cautious approach to storm chasing. During each tour, guests have the opportunity to learn from professional storm spotters, climatologists, and meteorologists on the intricacies of atmospheric science as they track and photograph storms.

Tours are held from late-April through early-July every year to coincide with peak tornado activity in Tornado Alley.

History 
The company was founded in 2000 by storm chaser and filmmaker, Martin Lisius. Tempest Tours started with 3 staff members and one van, but have since expanded to over 15 employees with 3 vehicles. The company saw around 20 tourists in their inaugural season but now host about 200 guests a season who come from around the world.

References 

Storm chasing
Companies based in Arlington, Texas
American companies established in 2000
2000 establishments in Texas
Travel and holiday companies of the United States